The Ambrosetti Forum organized by The European House – Ambrosetti, a consulting firm – is an annual international economic conference held at Villa d'Este, in the Italian town of Cernobbio on the shores of Lake Como. Since its inception in 1975, the Forum has brought together heads of state, ministers, Nobel laureates and businesspeople to discuss current challenges to the world's economies and societies.

Purpose
The Forum presents forecasts of economic and geo-political outlooks for the world, Europe and Italy. The forum also analyzes scientific and technological developments and their impacts on the future of business and society.

Participants and speakers

Media 
The event takes place behind closed doors.

2010 Edition

Main topics
 The economic outlook
 China after the global crisis
 Today the world of tomorrow – Scientific and technological developments
 Leadership today and sustainable development
 The education challenge
 Agenda for Europe:
 Speech by the President of the Italian Republic Giorgio Napolitano
 Progress report from the EU Council Presidency
 European governance after the Lisbon Treaty
 Europe and the crisis: Euro and financial market stability
 Europe and growth: single market and competitiveness
 The excellent company, today
 Italy in the global outlook:
 Competitiveness and development
 Presentation of research results: “Nuclear for the economy, environment and development”
 Justice
 Security
 Industrial relations and welfare
 Federalism
 Competitiveness of the Italian public sector
 Presentation by the Italian Minister for the Economy and Finance

Speakers

 Angelino Alfano – Minister of Justice, Italy
 Joaquín Almunia – European Commissioner for Competition
 José Maria Aznar – former prime minister, Spain
 Michel Barnier – European Commissioner for Internal Market and Services
 Maria Bartiromo – anchor, CNBC
 Fatih Birol – chief economist, IEA (International Energy Agency)
 Alberto Bombassei – vice president for Industrial Relations, Social Affairs and Welfare, Confindustria, Italy
 Raffaele Bonanni – secretary general, CISL, Italy
 Renato Brunetta – Minister for Public Administration and Innovation, Italy
 George W. Buckley – chairman, president and chief executive officer, 3M, US
 Fabrizio Capobianco – CEO TOK.tv, president and chairman Funambol 
 Cheng Siwei – dean, Management School, Graduate University of Chinese Academy of Science, China; former vice chairman, Standing Committee, National People’s Congress, China
 Piercamillo Davigo – judge of the Italian Supreme Court of Cassation
 Ferruccio De Bortoli – editor in chief, Il Corriere della Sera
 Piero Fassino – member of the Italian Parliament
 Niall Ferguson – professor of history, Harvard University
 Mauro Ferrari – president and chief executive officer, The Methodist Hospital Research Institute, Houston
 Jean-Paul Fitoussi – president, Observatoire Français des Conjonctures Economiques
 Carl Benedikt Frey – co-director, Oxford Martin School, University of Oxford
 Mariastella Gelmini – Minister of Education, University and Research, Italy
 Máire Geoghegan-Quinn – European Commissioner for Research, Innovation and Science
 Yasuchika Hasegawa – president and CEO, Takeda Pharmaceutical, Japan
 Abraham Heifets – co-founder and CEO, Atomwise, US
 Huang Jing – visiting professor, Lee Kuan Yew School of Public Policy, National University of Singapore
 Pietro Ichino – Member of the Senate, Italy
 Harold Kroto – Nobel laureate for Chemistry; Francis Eppes Professor of Chemistry, Florida State University
 Christine Lagarde – Minister of Economy, Industry and Employment, France
 Anne Lauvergeon – CEO, Areva; France
 Yves Leterme – prime minister, Belgium
 Enrico Letta – Member of the Italian Parliament
 Li Yuguang – deputy director, State Intellectual Property Office of the People’s Republic of China
 Edison Liu – executive director, Genome Institute of Singapore
 Emma Marcegaglia – president, Confindustria, Italy
 Roberto Maroni – Minister for Internal Affairs, Italy
 Mario Monti – president, Bocconi University, Italy
 Kenneth P. Morse – member, National Advisory Council on Innovation and Entrepreneurship (U.S. Department of Commerce); founding managing director, MIT Entrepreneurship Center; chair in Entrepreneurship, Innovation and Competitiveness, Delft University of Technology, Delft, The Netherlands
 Amre Moussa – secretary general, League of Arab States
 Wolfgang Munchau – associate editor, Financial Times
 Giorgio Napolitano – president of the Italian Republic – live, in videoconference
 Joaquín Navarro-Valls – president of advisory board, Campus Bio-Medico University, Rome; president, Telecom Italia Foundation
 Tommaso Padoa-Schioppa – president, Notre Europe, France
 Corrado Passera – managing director and CEO, Intesa Sanpaolo, Italy
 Shimon Peres – president, State of Israel
 Charles David Powell – House of Lords, UK
 :it:Federico Rampini – correspondent from the US, La Repubblica
 Marco Reguzzoni – Member of the Italian Parliament
 Jonas Ridderstråle – visiting professor, Ashridge Business School (UK); writer, Sweden
 Gianni Riotta – editor in chief, Il Sole 24 Ore, Italy
 Sergio Romano – columnist, Corriere della Sera, Italy
 Nouriel Roubini – professor of economics, Stern School of Business, New York University, US
 Card. Camillo Ruini – president of the Cultural Project Committee, Italian Episcopal Conference (CEI)
 Elena Salgado – Minister for the Economy and Finance, Spain
 Wolfgang Schüssel – former federal chancellor, Austria
 Hans-Werner Sinn – professor of economics and public finance, University of Munich; director of CES-Center for Economic Studies (University of Munich); president, Ifo Institute for Economic Research, Germany
 Peter Sutherland – president, Goldman Sachs International, UK
 Antonio Tajani – vice-president, European Commission and European Commissioner for Industry and Entrepreneurship
 Giulio Tremonti – Minister for the Economy and Finance, Italy
 Jean-Claude Trichet – president, European Central Bank
 Edwin Truman – senior fellow, Peterson Institute for International Economics, US
 Matti Vanhanen – former prime minister, Finland
 Yanis Varoufakis – Finance Minister of Greece
 Umberto Veronesi – director, European Institute of Oncology
 Jimmy Wales – founder, Wikipedia
 Geert Wilders – Ultra right wing member of parliament, the Netherlands

Notes

External links
 

Global economic conferences
Cernobbio